John Townsend (1789–1863) was an American politician from New York.

Life
He was the son of Israel Townsend (1742–1832) and Phebe (Weeks) Townsend (1752–1836). The family lived in Armonk, a hamlet in the Town of North Castle, Westchester County, New York. John Townsend married Eliza P. Horton, and they had six children.

He fought in the War of 1812, and was an associate judge of the Westchester County Court from 1816 to 1834. Afterwards he removed to New York City.

He was a member of the New York State Assembly (New York Co.) in 1846; and a member of the New York State Senate (1st D.) in 1847.

Sources
The New York Civil List compiled by Franklin Benjamin Hough (pages 135, 146, 232 and 310; Weed, Parsons and Co., 1858)
A Memorial of John, Henry and Richard Townsend and Their Descendants (1865; pg. 202f)
North Castle History (Vol. 28, 2008) [with "Israel Townsend House" on the front cover]

1789 births
1863 deaths
Democratic Party New York (state) state senators
Democratic Party members of the New York State Assembly
New York (state) state court judges
People from Armonk, New York
Politicians from New York City
19th-century American politicians
19th-century American judges